Kalleh Howzha (also Romanized as Kalleh Ḩowẕhā) is a village in Kuh Yakhab Rural District, Dastgerdan District, Tabas County, South Khorasan Province, Iran. At the 2006 census, its population was 49, in 11 families.

References 

Populated places in Tabas County